Susan Cadogan (born Alison Anne Cadogan; 2 November 1951) is a Jamaican reggae singer best known for her hit records in the 1970s.

Biography
Cadogan is the daughter of singer Lola Cadogan, who released several 78rpm singles of devotional music during the 1950s. She spent several years of her childhood in Belize, where her family had moved, before returning to Jamaica. She worked as an assistant librarian, taking a job in the library of the University of the West Indies at Mona. Her talents as a singer led to her recording her first single, "Love My Life" for Jamaican Broadcasting DJ Jerry Lewis, who was the boyfriend of one of Cadogan's schoolfriends. Lee "Scratch" Perry was in the recording studio at the time, and was impressed by Cadogan's voice enough to record an album's worth of material with her, also renaming her Susan.

One of her first recordings for Perry, a cover of Millie Jackson's soul hit, "Hurt So Good" (featuring bassist Boris Gardiner and the Zap Pow horns), was released to little effect in Jamaica on Perry's new '"Perries" record label, but was released in the UK by Dennis Harris' DIP International label, and topped the UK Reggae Chart. Magnet Records picked up the single after it was brought to the label by A&R man Pete Waterman, and it went on to reach No. 4 in the UK Singles Chart, with Cadogan flying to London to promote the single, including a television appearance on Top of the Pops. Perry was unhappy that Magnet had released the single, and after a court case it was determined that Trojan Records had the UK rights to the single. Cadogan then signed directly to Magnet, for whom she recorded a new version of the song. Magnet also issued the official follow-up, the Waterman-produced "Love Me Baby", which reached number 22 in July 1975, but was her last UK hit. Perry, meanwhile, arranged with the Birmingham-based label Black Wax to release an unofficial follow-up – a remixed version of "Love My Life". Other singles were released on Klik and Lucky in an attempt to cash in, but none of these charted. "Hurt So Good" was subsequently certified silver in the United Kingdom and gold in South Africa.

Two mid 1970s albums, the Waterman-produced Doing It Her Way and Susan Cadogan (compiled from Perry's productions) were released by Magnet and Trojan Records respectively, though with disappointing sales.

Cadogan returned to her library job, but resurfaced as a recording artist in 1982, having a string of hits in Jamaica including covers of "Tracks of My Tears" and "Piece of My Heart", and 1983's "(You Know How To Make Me) Feel So Good" – a duet with Ruddy Thomas. After returning again to her library job for most of the 1980s, she returned with the Mad Professor-produced album Soulful Reggae in 1992. A further album, Chemistry of Love, followed in 1995.

Cadogan caught the music bug once more in 2001, and she performed live at the Heineken Startime Series event in Kingston. More recently, Cadogan has toured together with Glen Adams and The Slackers as well as with the Portuguese band The Ratazanas.

In 2016 she released a five-song EP, Take Me Back, and in 2017 released "Love Story", a duet with Ken Boothe.

Album discography
Doing It Her Way (1975) Magnet
Susan Cadogan aka Hurt So Good (1976) Trojan
Chemistry of Love (1992) Imp
Soulful Reggae (1992) Ariwa
Stealing Love (1998) Rhino
The Rhythm in You (2003) Capo
Sincerely...Susan (2004) Capo
Two Sides of Susan (2008) JVC Japan
Take Me Back (2017) Jump Up!
The Girl Who Cried (2018)  Burning Sounds
Hurt So Good - Storybook Revisited (2020) Burning Sounds
The Girl Who Cried + Chemistry of Love (2021)  Burning Sounds

External links 
 Punkcast#631 live with the Jammyland All Stars – Club Seho, New York City, 3 December 2004. (RealPlayer, mp4)

References

1951 births
Living people
Musicians from Kingston, Jamaica
20th-century Jamaican women singers
Jamaican reggae singers
Trojan Records artists